Dulcita Lynn Lieggi Francisco (born 19 May 1989, in Santo Domingo) is a Dominican actress, model and beauty pageant title-holder. Ms. Lieggi was originally placed first runner-up to Carola Durán at Miss Dominican Republic 2012, but later Durán was dethroned and the title was given to Lieggi. Lieggi then represented the Dominican Republic at Miss Universe 2012.

Early life
Lieggi was born in Santo Domingo to father native of Mola di Bari (Apulia, Southern Italy) and a mother from Puerto Plata, Northern Dominican Republic.

Miss Dominican Republic and Miss Universe 2012
Lieggi competed as a representative of the province of Distrito Nacional, being one of 37 candidates in the country of Dominican Republic in the national beauty contest, Miss Dominican Republic 2012, broadcast live from Santo Domingo on 17 April 2012, where she became the first runner up for the title, winning the right to represent the Dominican Republic in Miss Continente Americano 2012. The second runner up, Carolyn Hawa, from Santiago, will represent the Dominican Republic in the Reina Hispanoamericana 2012 in Bolivia. The third runner up was Alondra Peña of Peravia, and the fourth runner up was Luz Quezada of San José de Ocoa. On 24 April 2012, exactly one week after winning the crown, Durán was dethroned for having once been married.

Lieggi got the title of Miss Dominican Republic 2012 representing the province of the capital, Distrito Nacional. She went on to compete in the Miss Universe 2012 pageant held in Las Vegas, USA. Lieggi did not make it to the top 16.

Filmography

Notes
 Lieggi was originally first Runner-up, but became Miss Dominican Republic 2012 after the original titleholder, Carola Durán, was dethroned

References

Dominican Republic beauty pageant winners
Miss Universe 2012 contestants
Living people
1989 births
Miss Dominican Republic
Dominican Republic people of Italian descent
People from Santo Domingo
Dominican Republic female models
Dominican Republic film actresses
White Dominicans